Hrvoje Kovačević (born 12 July 1982) is a Croatian association football player currently playing for NK Lučko.

He began his career playing for HNK Cibalia in the Croatian Prva HNL, before signing a contract with Israeli team Bnei Yehuda Tel Aviv in the 2005/2006 season. He later moved to Hapoel Ramat Gan where he played in 2009.

References

External links
 Profile at Sportnet.hr
 Profile at Nogometni-magazin.com
National team profile

1982 births
Living people
Sportspeople from Vinkovci
Association football midfielders
Croatian footballers
Croatia youth international footballers
Croatia under-21 international footballers
HNK Cibalia players
Bnei Yehuda Tel Aviv F.C. players
Hapoel Ramat Gan F.C. players
Maccabi Herzliya F.C. players
NK Istra 1961 players
NK Lučko players
NK Rudeš players
Croatian Football League players
Israeli Premier League players
Croatian expatriate footballers
Expatriate footballers in Israel
Croatian expatriate sportspeople in Israel